Voinjama Airport  is an airport serving the town of Voinjama, Liberia.

See also
Transport in Liberia

References

 World Airport Codes - Voinjama Tenebu
 Google Earth

Airports in Liberia